The 4th Australian Academy of Cinema and Television Arts International Awards (commonly known as the AACTA International Awards), are to be presented by the Australian Academy of Cinema and Television Arts (AACTA), a non-profit organisation whose aim is to identify, award, promote and celebrate Australia's greatest achievements in film and television. Awards will be handed out for the best films of 2014 regardless of the country of origin, and are the international counterpart to the awards for Australian films (held on 27 and 29 January). The winners will be announced in Los Angeles, California on 31 January 2015 as part of the Australia Week event. The ceremony will be hosted by Nicole Kidman and Geoffrey Rush and broadcast in Australia on Arena on 1 February.

The nominees were announced on 7 January 2015. Birdman received the most nominations with seven in all categories except Best Lead Actress.

Background
On 9 December 2014, a partnership between AACTA and G'day LA organisers was announced. At this announcement it was revealed that the 4th AACTA International Awards will be presented during the G'day LA black tie gala, an event which usually hands out awards for achievements by Australians in Hollywood. Nominees were chosen by the international chapter of the academy which comprises 140 members of Australian filmmakers and executives "with distinguished international credentials." The ceremony will be held on 31 January and presided over by Nicole Kidman and Geoffrey Rush. The event will be broadcast in Australia on subscription television channel Arena for the second year running on 1 February 2015.

Winners and nominees
The final nominees were announced on 7 January 2015. Of those nominated, Birdman or (The Unexpected Virtue of Ignorance) received the most nominations with seven in all categories except for Best Actress. Other nominated productions include Boyhood and The Imitation Game with five, Whiplash with four, The Grand Budapest Hotel with three, Foxcatcher and The Theory of Everything with two and The Babadook, Dawn of the Planet of the Apes, Gone Girl, Into the Woods, Still Alice and Wild with one each.

See also
 4th AACTA Awards
 20th Critics’ Choice Awards
 21st Screen Actors Guild Awards
 68th British Academy Film Awards
 72nd Golden Globe Awards
 87th Academy Awards

References

External links
 The Official Australian Academy of Cinema and Television Arts website
 Official Website of the AACTA International Awards broadcast

AACTA International Awards
AACTA International Awards
AACTA International Awards
AACTA Awards ceremonies
AACTA International